Year 209 (CCIX) was a common year starting on Sunday (link will display the full calendar) of the Julian calendar. At the time, it was known as the Year of the Consulship of Commodus and Lollianus (or, less frequently, year 962 Ab urbe condita). The denomination 209 for this year has been used since the early medieval period, when the Anno Domini calendar era became the prevalent method in Europe for naming years.

Events 
 By place 

 Roman Empire 
 Publius Septimius Geta receives the titles of Imperator and Augustus from his father, Emperor Septimius Severus.
 Septimius Severus makes plans to subdue the land to the north of Scotland, ravaging it severely. Road-building and forest-clearing, the Roman army reaches Aber; Scottish tribes begin guerrilla warfare.

 India 
 Beginning of the reign of Chandra Shri Satakarni, ruler of the Satavahana Dynasty in Andhra Pradesh (approximate date).

Births 
 Dongcheon, Korean ruler of Goguryeo (d. 248)
 Fu Jia, Chinese official and politician (d. 255)
 Guan Lu, Chinese diviner and politician (d. 256)
 Sun Deng (or Zigao), Chinese crown prince (d. 241)
 Xiahou Xuan, Chinese general and politician (d. 254)

Deaths 
 Chen Deng, Chinese general and politician (b. 170)
 Jin  Xuan (or Yuanji), Chinese official and warlord 
 Li Tong, Chinese general and politician (b. 168)
 Liu Qi, Chinese general, governor and politician
 Xun Yue, Chinese scholar and official (b. 148)

References